Year 1037 (MXXXVII) was a common year starting on Saturday (link will display the full calendar) of the Julian calendar.

Events 
 By place 

 Europe 
 Spring – A revolt in northern Italy is started by Archbishop Aribert of Milan. King Henry III (eldest son of Emperor Conrad II) travels south of the Alps to quell it.
 February – At an Imperial Diet in Pavia (assembled by Conrad II), Aribert is accused of fomenting a revolt against the Holy Roman Empire, Conrad orders his arrest.
 May – Conrad II, with Pavian assistance, lays siege to Milan at the Porta Romana side, but the city holds out. In Rome, Pope Benedict IX deposes Aribert as archbishop.
 May 28 – Conrad II decrees the Constitutio de Feudis which protects the rights of the valvassores (knights and burghers of the cities) in Lombardia (modern Italy).
 Summer – A Byzantine expeditionary force under George Maniakes lands at Sicily, and defeats the Zirids. Maniakes begins his campaign to reconquer the island.
 September 4 – Battle of Tamarón: Ferdinand I defeats and kills his brother-in-law Bermudo III. Ferdinand becomes the king of Castile and León (modern Spain).
 November 15 – Battle of Bar-le-Duc: Odo II, Count of Blois and Champagne, while invading the Duchy of Lorraine dies in battle with forces loyal to Gothelo I.

 England 
 King Harold I seizes the throne of England from his half-brother Harthacnut. His mother, Emma of Normandy flees to Bruges in Flanders (modern Belgium).

 Asia 
 The Chinese rime dictionary of the Jiyun is published during the Song Dynasty.

Births 
 January 8 – Su Dongpo, Chinese calligrapher (d. 1101)
 Beatrice I, German abbess of Quedlinburg (d. 1061)
 Hawise, duchess of Brittany (approximate date)

Deaths 
 September 4 – Bermudo III (or Vermudo), king of León
 November 15 – Odo II, French nobleman (b. 983)
 Abu'l-Hasan Mihyar al-Daylami, Persian poet
 Abu Mansur al-Baghdadi, Persian Shafi'i scholar 
 Baba Kuhi of Shiraz, Persian Sufi mystic (b. 948)
 Avicenna, Persian physician and polymath (b. 980)
 Boleslaus III (the Red), duke of Bohemia
 Ding Wei, grand chancellor of the Song Dynasty
 Farrukhi Sistani, Persian poet (or 1038)
 John of Debar, Bulgarian clergyman and bishop
 Muhammad al-Baghdadi, Persian mathematician
 Muirgeas ua Cú Ceanainn, king of Uí Díarmata
 Robert II, French prelate and archbishop
 Siegfried II, German nobleman (b. 956)
 William III (Taillefer), French nobleman

References